Adrian Andreev (born 12 May 2001) is a professional Bulgarian tennis player. He has a career-high ATP singles ranking of World No. 189 achieved on 19 December 2022. He is currently the No. 2 Bulgarian player. Andreev won the 2018 US Open Junior doubles title with Anton Matusevich. He has a career-high doubles ranking of world No. 584 achieved on 12 September 2022.

Junior career

As a junior, he reached a career-high ITF ranking of No. 2 on 31 December 2018.

Andreev won the 2017 Eddie Herr Junior Championships both in singles and in doubles. 

In 2018, Andreev won the Junior title at the US Open in doubles with Anton Matusevich, becoming the second Bulgarian to win the US Open after Grigor Dimitrov in 2008 Singles. 
In October 2018, Andreev reached the semifinals in singles at the 2018 Summer Youth Olympics and the final in doubles winning the silver, teaming with Australia’s Rinky Hijikata. 

In 2018, Andreev also won the bronze medal of the end-of-year junior competition, the ITF Junior Masters.

Professional career

2016-2020: Turning Pro, ATP debut
Andreev made his debut at ATP level at the age of 15, when he received a wildcard for the qualifications of the 2016 Moselle Open, where he lost to Michael Berrer. 

Andreev played as a wildcard at the 2017 Sofia Open in his homeland for the first time, losing in two sets to Maximilian Marterer in the qualifications. 

The following year, Andreev received another wildcard, this time for the main draw of the 2018 Sofia Open event, but lost to Denis Istomin. The 17-year old Bulgarian became the first player born in 2001 to play in the main draw of the ATP World Tour. 

In the 2019 Sofia Open, Andreev was granted another wildcard for the main draw. The Bulgarian pushed world No. 45 Matthew Ebden to three sets, but ultimately lost in the third set tie-break. 

A year later Andreev received another wildcard for the main draw at the 2020 Sofia Open, but could not go past world No. 38 and sixth seed John Millman.

2021: First ATP win, top 350 debut
At the beginning of the season, Andreev qualified for the main draw of the Antalya Open and managed to record his first ATP win defeating Marsel İlhan in straight sets before he lost to the eventual champion Alex de Minaur in the second round. Andreev recorded his first Top 100 win at the Singapore Open, where he defeated world No. 82 Lloyd Harris before losing out to the eventual champion Alexei Popyrin in the second round. As a result, Andreev climbed to a high-career No. 382 in the ATP rankings.

At the 2021 Sofia Open Andreev lost to world No. 62 Miomir Kecmanovic after receiving a fourth consecutive year wildcard into the main draw.

2022: Challenger semis, Top 200 debut, Bulgarian No. 2
In January, Andreev reached his first Challenger semifinal as a qualifier at the 2022 Città di Forlì II where he lost to third seed Jay Clarke.
In  April, he also reached the quarterfinals at the 2022 Sarasota Open but retired against fifth seed and eventual champion Daniel Elahi Galán.

In the following months he also reached the round of 16 in four Challengers in Coquimbo, Colombia in May, and as a qualifier in Orlando, Florida in June, in Amersfoot, Netherlands in July and in Meerbusch, Germany in August where he lost to third seed Andrea Collarini, third seed Christopher Eubanks, second seed & eventual runner-up world No. 81 Roberto Carballés Baena and Damir Džumhur respectively.

In August, Andreev reached his first Challenger final in doubles at the IBG Prague Open, playing alongside Murkel Dellien, but the Bulgarian-Bolivian duo couldn't go the whole way and lost in the title match to Victor Vlad Cornea and Andrew Paulson.

The Bulgarian's third Challenger quarterfinal showing came at the Open de Rennes tournament in September, where in the round of 16 Andreev scored his second Top 100 win, overcoming the world No. 95 and third seed Hugo Grenier after a third set tiebreak. In the quarterfinals, he faced the 2020 US Open champion and former world No. 3 Dominic Thiem, but failed to score another upset, losing out in three sets to the Austrian.

Ranked No. 309 at the AON Open Challenger in Genoa, he entered the main draw as an alternate and started his campaign with a win over former top-100 player Salvatore Caruso. In the second round, Andreev scored a big upset over world No. 64 and third seed Corentin Moutet, saving three match points for his third Top 100 win of his career to reach his forth quarterfinal of the season. With his next straight sets win over Raúl Brancaccio, he reached his second Challenger semifinal and the top 250, climbing more than 60 positions in the rankings. There he lost to second seed and eventual champion Thiago Monteiro. Thanks to his successful run in Genoa, he rose to a new career-high of No. 247 on 26 September 2022.

He received a special exemption for his next Challenger, the 2022 Open d'Orléans, where he reached again the quarterfinals, for the fifth time in the season, defeating Ramkumar Ramanathan and again Corentin Moutet, who this time was the top seed, in three tight sets in a three hours match. Next he defeated world No. 98 and sixth seed Norbert Gombos, his fourth top-100 win in a month, to reach his third Challenger semifinal. He lost to fourth seed Quentin Halys. As a result Andreev climbed close to 40 positions in the rankings to world No. 211 on 3 October 2022. The following week at the 2022 Saint-Tropez Open he entered as a lucky loser but lost in the first round to Stefano Travaglia.

At the 2022 HPP Open in Helsinki, he reached the quarterfinals as an alternate defeating Jay Clarke and Mattia Bellucci. As a result he moved 13 positions up to a new year-end career-high of No. 207 on 21 November 2022. The next day he further reached the top 200 with a round of 16 showing at the Challenger in Valencia. The day after he was confirmed as a participant at the 2023 United Cup as part of the Bulgarian team. He reached another quarterfinal defeating Ivan Gakhov. He lost to  Serbian  Nikola Milojevic in a close three set match despite winning the first set with a bagel at 6-0. He reached a new career-high singles ranking of No. 197 moving 10 positions up on 28 November 2022 making him the Bulgarian male player No. 2 in the rankings ahead of Dimitar Kuzmanov. He reached another quarterfinal at the 2022 Maspalomas Challenger but he withdrew from the match due to injury against another Serbian Dusan Lajovic. He moved to No. 193 in the singles rankings ending his season on 2 December 2022.

2023: United Cup debut, First Grand Slam qualifications
He made his 2023 United Cup debut in the mixed doubles match alongside  
Gergana Topalova where they lost to the top seeded team of Maria Sakkari and Stefanos Tsitsipas. 

At the 2023 Australian Open qualifications, he defeated Francesco Maestrelli, and 15th seed Jurij Rodionov but fell to 20th seed Zizou Bergs in the final round.
He regained the Bulgarian No. 2 ranking on 20 February 2023.

Year-end ATP ranking

Challenger and ITF World Tennis Tour finals

Singles: 6 (2–4)

Doubles: 1 (0–1)

National participation

Davis Cup (2 wins, 2 losses)
Adrian Andreev debuted for the Bulgaria Davis Cup team in 2018. Since then he has 4 nominations with 4 ties played, his singles W/L record is 1–1 and doubles W/L record is 1–1 (2–2 overall).

   indicates the result of the Davis Cup match followed by the score, date, place of event, the zonal classification and its phase, and the court surface.

United Cup (0 wins, 1 loss)

Junior Grand Slam finals

Doubles: 1 (1–0)

References

External links

 
 
 

2001 births
Living people
Bulgarian male tennis players
Tennis players at the 2018 Summer Youth Olympics
Grand Slam (tennis) champions in boys' doubles
US Open (tennis) junior champions
Sportspeople from Sofia
21st-century Bulgarian people